The Tour de Snowy was an international women's road bicycle race held in the Snowy Mountains region of New South Wales, Australia from 1998 to 2002. The Tour had from five to nine stages and attracted professional cyclists from around the world as an important event in the women's road racing calendar.

Originally sponsored by the Snowy Mountains Hydro-Electric Authority and the NSW Department of Sport & Recreation, the Tour De Snowy was discontinued in 2003 due to lack of sponsorship.

General Classification Winners

Women's road bicycle races
Cycle races in Australia
Defunct cycling races in Australia
Recurring sporting events established in 1998
Recurring sporting events disestablished in 2002
1998 establishments in Australia
2002 disestablishments in Australia